Subaşı (literally "head (baş) of the army/military (sü)" or "chief (baş) soldier (sü)") is a Turkish surname derived from the synonymous Ottoman title and may refer to:
 Burutay Subaşı (born 1990), Turkish volleyball player
 Edibe Subaşı (1920–2011), Turkish aviator
 Hande Subaşı (born 1984), Turkish actress
 Yakup Şevki Subaşı (1876–1939), general of the Ottoman Army
 Yasir Subaşı (born 1996), Turkish footballer 
Turkish-language surnames
Occupational surnames